The Produce Marketing Association (PMA) is a global trade association whose 2200 members represent the full supply chain of the produce and mass-market floral industry, from seed producer to supermarket or foodservice outlet.  It was founded in 1949.  Mike O'Brien of Schnucks Markets in St. Louis, MO is the current chairman of the board of directors.  The CEO is Bryan Silbermann, and the president is Cathy Burns.  PMA sponsors an annual convention and exposition called Fresh Summit.

PMA has 2,900-member companies in 54 countries. The company focuses on the five-following member needs: Demand Creation, Global Connections, Science & Technology, Industry Talent and Sustainability.

History
Formed in 1949 during the inaugural National Conference on Prepackaging, PMA (then Produce Prepackaging Association) was led by Paul B. Dickman and aimed to revolutionize the produce industry by delivering member networking and educational opportunities.

In 1958, official headquarters moved from New York to Newark, Delaware, with Robert Carey as Executive Secretary. This marks a turning point for the organization.

The organization officially changed its name to Produce Marketing Association in 1970. This is when PMA created three operating division to address increasing member demand for services: retailer, producer and distributor.

In 1974 PMA joined the floral industry when it formed the Floral Marketing Division to represent mass-market floral members.

The Produce Electronic Identification Board (PEIB) was created by PMA in 1987 to administer standardized Price Look-Up (PLU) codes. The following year, in 1988, PMA joined with United Fresh & Vegetable Association to establish the Center for Produce Quality.

In 1989 Bob Carey became President of PMA after three decades of service to the association.

PMA.com was launched in 1995, establishing the association as an online destination for produce industry members. By taking advantage of new communications technologies to connect to members worldwide, the association could now provide 24-hour access to information and create a virtual trade show.

In 1996 Bryan Silbermann succeeded Bob Carey as President and CEO. During his time with PMA Bryan Silbermann helped standardize PLU/UPC codes, spearheaded the Produce Traceability Initiative (PTI), began the import-export committee that became the International Trade Committee to Global Strategy and Development committees. Silbermann also helped institute the Produce for Better Health (PBH) program, FNV, Center for Produce Quality, Center for Produce Safety and Partnership for Food Safety Education, along with many other achievements during his time with PMA.

PMA initiated the Pack Family/Career Pathways Program in 2004, which would later be re-named the Center for Growing Talent.

In 2017 Cathy Burns succeeded Bryan Silbermann as CEO of PMA. Burns currently holds the CEO position at PMA.

References 

Business organizations based in the United States
Food industry trade groups
Marketing in the United States